= Moses Odunwa =

Speaker of the 7th Ebonyi State House of Assembly

Moses Odunwa (born 1966) is a Nigerian politician currently serving as the speaker of the 7th Ebonyi State House of Assembly. A member of the All Progressives Congress (APC) representing Ikwo South, he was nominated for the speakership position by Nkemka Onuma representing Edda West State constituency and was seconded by Abiri Godwin Abiri, representing Izzi West constituency. He was elected speaker of the house unchallenged.

Odunwa was first elected to the state assembly in 2019.
